Krui River, a perennial river of the Hunter River catchment, is located in the Upper Hunter region of New South Wales, Australia.

Course and features
Krui River rises on the southern slopes of the Great Dividing Range, below Oxleys Peak, at Mount Palmer and flows generally southwest, joined by six minor tributaries before reaching its confluence with the Goulburn River near Comiala Flat. The river descends  over its  course.

Near the village of Collaroy, the Golden Highway crosses the Krui River.

See also

 Rivers of New South Wales
 List of rivers of New South Wales (A–K)
 List of rivers of Australia
 Goulburn River National Park

References

External links
 
 Water Sharing Rules: Krui River Water Source from the NSW Office of Water

 

Rivers of New South Wales
Rivers of the Hunter Region
Upper Hunter Shire